Rumpole on Trial is a collection of short stories by John Mortimer about defence barrister Horace Rumpole. They were adapted from his scripts for the TV series of the same name.
The stories were:
"Rumpole and the Children of the Devil" 
"Rumpole and the Eternal Triangle"
"Rumpole and the Family Pride"
"Rumpole and the Miscarriage of Justice"
"Rumpole and the Reform of Joby Jonson"
"Rumpole and the Soothsayer"
"Rumpole on Trial"

References

Works by John Mortimer
1992 short story collections